A Senate Document (often abbreviated S. Doc.) is an official document ordered to be printed by the United States Senate.  Documents are numbered in a serial manner for inclusion in the U.S. Serial Set, and serve a major part of the historical record of the Senate.  Documents can include reports of executive departments and agencies, texts of various presidential communications to Congress, accounts of committee activities and committee-sponsored special studies, and miscellaneous publications such as ceremonial tributes to individuals or reports of patriotic organizations.

References

External links 
 CDOC Collection of the GPO's Federal Digital System - Contains links to the full texts of House and Senate Documents of the 94th Congress through present (1975–present).
 U.S. Congressional Serial Set - Numerical list of Documents and Reports of the 85th Congress through the 111th Congress (1957–2010).
 U.S. Serial Set Selected Documents and Reports - Select Congressional Documents and Reports of the 23rd Congress through the 64th Congress (1833–1917).

United States Senate
Government documents of the United States